David Hu is a cofounder of IIG Capital and served as its chief investment officer (CIO). In April 2022, Hu was sentenced to 12 years in prison for running a Ponzi scheme, defrauding and scamming customers of more than $120 million. Moreover, Hu fabricated documents to hide his financial losses. Hu's partner Martin Silver was also found guilty of running the Ponzi scheme.

David Hu's case was handled by the Securities and Commodities Task Force and the United States Department of Justice (DOJ). Attorneys Drew Skinner, Negar Tekeei, and Alex Rossmiller were in charge of prosecuting Hu, and Judge Alvin K. Hellerstein sentenced Hu to 12 years in prison. The FBI and U.S. Securities and Exchange Commission (SEC) also assisted with the investigation.

Background 
In 1994, David Hu and Martin Silver cofounded IIG Capital, an RIA firm based in Manhattan, and registered their company with the SEC. IIG was a New Jersey limited liability company that operated in New York. David Hu worked as its chief investment officer, while Martin worked as its chief operating officer. Their company specialized in global trade, investment funds, and loans. The company also provided advisory services and management through three private funds: the IIG Global Trade Finance Fund (GTFF), Structured Trade Finance Fund (STFF), and Trade Opportunities Fund (TOF). 

Specifically, they provided loans for Central and South American small and medium-sized enterprises using food products like fish and coffee as collateral. For example, they advised the Venezuela Recovery Fund (VRF) for a failed bank in Venezuela.

The GTFF, STFF, and TOF were marketed to institutional investors, including hedge funds, pension funds, and insurance funds. IIG advertised that they would follow due diligence and abide by risk controls for investors. Hu made money based on a management fee and performance fee on IIG funds.

Ponzi scheme 
For more than a decade from 2007 to 2019, David Hu defrauded customers, stealing over $100 million in investor's money at IIG. David Hu and Martin deceived their customers by falsifying documents and lying saying fake and defaulted loans were doing well.

For example, in December 2012, the firm began advising a retail mutual fund for retail investors. IIG recommended the fund to invest in a $6 million loan to an Argentina borrower. However, in 2017, the borrower did not pay back the principal. Hu then tried to conceal the default by mismarking and falsifying documents. 

Furthermore, Hu would overvalue negatively-performing loans, fabricate paperwork to create fake loans, mismark the fake loans as positively-performing, and then sell these fake loans to a collateralized loan obligation trust (CLO trust) and other private funds managed by IIG. Hu then used the proceeds from these fraudulent transactions to repay earlier investors, thereby running a Ponzi scheme for a decade.

In March 2018, IIG informed the SEC that it had more than $373 million in assets under management.

Arrest 
On November 21, 2019, the SEC charged IIG with fraud. On November 26, 2019, the SEC further revoked IIG's registration.

In 2020, Hu was arrested by authorities and charged with fraud by government regulators. In March 2020, IIG agreed to pay $35 million in disgorgement and interest to settle the fraud. Furthermore, the SEC enjoined IIG from further violating federal anti-fraud laws.

On July 17, 2020, the SEC and DOJ filed a complaint stipulating that Hu violated Section 17(a) of the Securities Act of 1933, Section 10(b) of the Securities Exchange Act of 1934, and various rules of the Investment Advisers Act of 1940.

The SEC accused Hu of organizing multiple frauds since October 2013, overvaluing assets, charging inflated fees, selling $60 million in fake loans, using the proceeds to pay earlier investors, hoodwinking clients by providing fake documentation for non-existent loans, forging credit, and fabricating promissory notes.

The SEC investigation of Hu was spearheaded by Philip A. Fortino, Lindsay Moilanen, Diego Brucculeri, Eli Bass and was supervised by Sheldon L. Pollock and Osman Nawaz. The FBI also assisted the SEC in the investigation.

Prosecution 
David Hu was charged in the case U.S. v Hu, 20-cr-360. The trial took place in the U.S. District Court, Southern District of New York in Manhattan.

On January 28, 2021, Hu pleaded guilty of fraud, including wire fraud, securities fraud, investment adviser fraud, and conspiracy. In April 2021, Martin also pleaded guilty.

Crimes 
Hu was charged with the following crimes:

 Mismarking defaulted loans
 Mismarking distressed loans, including loans where the borrowers missed several scheduled payments
 Fabricating fake loans to cover up losses of defaulting loans of TOF from auditors
 Abusing a CLO trust to create liquidity on fake loans
 Abusing Panama shell entities created by IIG to hide losses
 Selling more than $200 million in fake loans to GTFF and STFF to create liquidity
 Getting a mutual fund to invest in a fake $6 million loan in December 2012. The borrower failed to repay the loan in February 2017. Hu forged documents to conceal the fraud and cover up the Ponzi scheme.

For his crimes, Hu faced a maximum prison sentence of 20 years.

Sentence 
In April 2022, U.S. District Manhattan Judge Alvin Hellerstein sentenced David Hu to 12 years in prison. Hellerstein said the 12-year sentence was to deter others in the financial industry from engaging in a similar kind of fraud. According to U.S. New York Attorney Damian Williams, Hu defrauded clients of over $120 million. Damian Williams accused Hu of falsifying documents, lying to auditors, selling fake loans, and losing millions of dollars of client's money. Manhattan Attorney Audrey Strauss accused Hu of failing to fulfill his fiduciary responsibilities, creating fake loans, and using the gains from those to pay earlier customers.

In addition to 12 years in prison, Hu was ordered to serve three years of supervised release. Hu's ill-gotten assets of $4,798,232 plus interest $461,477 were also ordered to be disgorged. In a parallel proceeding, Hu was found guilty and ordered to forfeit these assets and pay restitution. In total, Hu was also forced to forfeit more than $129 million in funds related to his crimes.

Initially, federal prosecutors asked for Hu to be sentenced for 15 years in prison, arguing that Hu's lies, deception, and the damage caused to customers warranted a longer sentence. Hu's lawyers lobbied for a 5-year term, arguing that Hu was trying to pursue the American Dream and that Hu's old age and health problems would make a long prison term equivalent to a life sentence.

Hu apologized to his clients and admitted that he betrayed and failed them.

Hu was sent to be confined in Lompoc, California in a federal prison.

On September 22, 2022, the U.S. District Court enjoined Hu from further violating antifraud laws.

In February 2023, Martin was sentenced to 13 months in prison. Martin was given a shorter sentence as it was mainly Hu who masterminded the Ponzi scheme. Martin was 65 years old at the time of his sentence.

Personal life 
Hu was 64 years old at the time of his sentencing in 2022. Hu lived in West Orange, New Jersey, with his wife and two children.

References 

Living people
21st-century criminals
People convicted of fraud
Chief investment officers
People from West Orange, New Jersey